Moland Church may refer to:

Moland Church (Fyresdal), a church in Fyresdal municipality in Telemark county, Norway
Austre Moland Church, a church in Arendal municipality in Agder county, Norway
Vestre Moland Church, a church in Lillesand municipality in Agder county, Norway